Mallaha was a Palestinian Arab village, located  northeast of Safed, on the highway between the latter and Tiberias. 'Ain Mallaha is the local Arabic name for a spring that served as the water source for the village inhabitants throughout the ages. It is also one of the names used in English to refer to the ancient Natufian era settlement at the site.

History

Prehistory

Evidence of settlement at Mallaha (or 'Ain Mallaha) dates back to the Mesolithic period circa 10,000 BCE. The floors and walls of the homes were decorated in solid white or red, a simple and popular decorative motif in the Near East at the time. The inhabitants appear to have subsisted on fish from nearby Lake Hula, as well as by hunting and gathering; no evidence of animal domestication or cultivation has been found, with the exception of dogs: the burial of a human being with a domestic dog at the site represents the earliest known archaeological evidence of dog domestication.

Crusader period
During the Crusader era, the Franks referred to Mallaha as Merla. Ibn al-Qalanisi describes a battle that took place at Mallaha in June 1157 between the Arab and Turkish forces of Nur ad-Din Zangi and those of the Crusaders under King Baldwin III. Qalanisi writes that Nur ad-Din sent his troops to Mallaha immediately after learning via pigeon post that the Franks had set up an encampment there. The battle, as described by Qalanisi, was bloody and quick, resulting in decisive victory for the Muslim forces, who are reported to have lost only two men, with the king narrowly escaping with a bodyguard. The battles for control over Mallaha continued. The Itinerary of Richard I notes that the army had advanced to Merla, "where the king had spent one of the previous nights."

Mamluk period
Just SE of Mallaha (at grid 2071/2737), excavations have revealed structures, probably dating to thirteenth or fourteenth century, that is after the area fell to Mamluk sultan Baybars. The structures have been assumed to belong to a sugar-producing installation.

Ottoman period
Mallaha, like most of Palestine, was incorporated into the Ottoman Empire in the early sixteenth century. Sufi traveller al-Bakri al-Siddiqi passed by the village in the mid-eighteenth century.

Johann Ludwig Burckhardt travelled in the region during the start of the nineteenth century, but according to  Edward Robinson, who travelled there in 1838, Burckhardt mislabeled the whole S.W. coast of the lake as el-Mellahah. Robinson observed that Ain el-Mallaha lay northwest of Lake Hula, and was "a single large fountain." Nearby was "usually a large encampment of the Ghawarineh in tents and reed huts."

In 1881, the PEF's Survey of Western Palestine (SWP) described Ain el Mellahah as a "very large perennial spring, flowing in a long stream from the base of the mountain; at once turns a mill, and forms almost a small river."

British Mandate

During the British Mandate times, Mallaha had a roughly rectangular configuration that stretched from north to south. The population lived mostly of agriculture. In the 1922 census of Palestine, Mallaha had a population of 440, all Muslims, increasing in the 1931 census to a population of 654, still all Muslims, in 161 houses.

The population, combined with that of 'Arab al-Zubayd, came to 890 Muslims in  the 1945 statistics, with a total of 2,168 dunams of land.  In 1944/45 a total of 1,761 dunums were used for cereals by the villagers, while 20 dunams were classifies as built-up land.

1948 and after
On 25 May 1948 the villagers left their homes on the advice of their Jewish neighbours. This was part of a "whispering campaign" launched by the Haganah following Operation Yiftach.

According to the Palestinian historian Walid Khalidi, describing the remains of the village in 1992: "The sandy hill on which the village was situated is completely overgrown with tall grass, cactuses, and weeds, as well as an assortment of fig, eucalyptus, and date-palm trees. Amidst the overgrowth, stone rubble from destroyed houses can be seen. The surrounding land is cultivated by the settlement of Yesud ha-Ma'ala.

A village history was published in Damascus in 2005. According to a commentator on Palestinian village history, Rochelle A. Davis, this history is especially notable due to the prominent role women are given in describing village life. Davis believes this might be because the villagers belonged to the Ghawarneh group, where women traditionally took more prominent roles.

See also
Depopulated Palestinian locations in Israel
Al-Mansura
Al-Salihiyya

References

Bibliography

External links
Welcome to Mallaha
Mallaha, Zochrot
Al-Mallaha, Dr. Khalil Rizk
Survey of Western Palestine, map 4:  IAA, Wikimedia commons
Mallaha, from the Khalil Sakakini Cultural Center

Arab villages depopulated during the 1948 Arab–Israeli War
District of Safad
Hula Valley